Back to the Streets of San Francisco is a 1992 American made-for-television crime drama film based on the 1972–1977 series The Streets of San Francisco. It stars Karl Malden as police detective Mike Stone and Darleen Carr as his daughter Jeannie, both cast members of the original show. It was directed by Mel Damski and broadcast on NBC on January 27, 1992.

Plot
Mike Stone, newly promoted to Captain of Inspectors, must solve the murder of his old partner, Steve Keller (played in the original series by Michael Douglas, who chose not to appear in the film). Flashbacks of Keller appear from the original show, and he is shown in a framed picture on Stone's desk.

At the same time, Stone is trying to decide which of two competing inspectors, Sarah Burns or David O'Connor, should take his place as the lieutenant in charge of homicide.

Cast
 Karl Malden as Mike Stone
 Michael Douglas as Steve Keller (seen in flashbacks)
 Debrah Farentino as Sarah Burns
 Conor O'Farrell as David O'Connor
 Carl Lumbly as Charlie Walker
 Darleen Carr as Jeannie Stone
 Paul Benjamin as Henry Brown
 Robert Parnell as Sam Hendrix
 William Daniels as Judge Julius Burns
 Nick Scoggin as Carl Murchinson
 Ed Vasgersian as Sergeant Pasarella
 Lorri Holt as Anne Keller
 Rod Gnapp as Razor
 Keith Douglas as Jacob Stubbs
 Amy Resnick as Diana West
 Richard Dupell as J.T. the Clown

Reception 
In the weekly Nielsen rating period of January 27 - February 2, 1992, the TV movie received a 13.2 rating and 20 share. 18.9 million viewers watched, ranking #23 out of 84 network programs aired.

References

External links
 

1992 television films
1992 films
1990s English-language films
1992 crime drama films
American crime drama films
Television series reunion films
Films directed by Mel Damski
NBC network original films
Films based on television series
Television films based on television series
American drama television films
1990s American films